Aflou (Berber language: Aflu) is a town and commune in Laghouat Province, Algeria. Aflou is the capital of Aflou District. Its population in 1998 was 48,000.

Localities  of the commune 
The commune of Aflou  is composed of 6 localities:

References

External links

Le Djebel Amour

Communes of Laghouat Province